Rustam Ibrayev  (born 29 May 1991) is a Kazakhstani judoka.

He won a silver medal at the 2015 World Judo Championships in Astana. He also won the Grand Slam in Baku in 2015.

References

External links
 

1991 births
Living people
Kazakhstani male judoka
Universiade medalists in judo
Universiade bronze medalists for Kazakhstan
Medalists at the 2017 Summer Universiade
21st-century Kazakhstani people